Bumping Lake is a lake and reservoir along the course of the Bumping River, in Yakima County, Washington state, USA. Bumping Lake has also named as "Lake Plehnam" by Preston's Map of Oregon and Washington in the 1850s, and "Tannum Lake" by the United States General Land Office Map of Washington of 1897. 

The lake is used as a storage reservoir for the Yakima Project, an irrigation project run by the United States Bureau of Reclamation. Although a natural lake, Bumping Lake's capacity and discharge is controlled by Bumping Lake Dam, a 60-foot (18 m) high earthfill structure built in 1910 and modified in the 1990s.

References

External links
 
 Bumping Lake - Recreation.gov
 Friends of Bumping Lake
 Bumping Lake Dam, United States Bureau of Reclamation
 

Reservoirs in Washington (state)
Lakes of Yakima County, Washington
Buildings and structures in Yakima County, Washington
Okanogan National Forest
Dams in Washington (state)
United States Bureau of Reclamation dams
Dams completed in 1910